LEROS is a family of chemical rocket engines manufactured by Nammo at Westcott, Buckinghamshire, United Kingdom. LEROS engines have been used as primary apogee engines for telecommunications satellites such as the Lockheed Martin A2100 as well as deep space missions such as Juno.

The family of engines derives from the LEROS 1 which was developed and qualified in the 1990s by Royal Ordnance. The in-space propulsion business was acquired by British Aerospace, then had a sequence of owners including American Pacific Corporation, Moog (from 2012) and Nammo (2017). The LEROS engines are made of niobium alloy, which is traditionally used for liquid rocket engines such as the attitude control thrusters of the Apollo Lunar Module. As of 2011, more than 70 LEROS 1 series engines had been flown successfully.

Uses 

LEROS engines have been used on a number of NASA and other space agency missions:

 NEAR Shoemaker (Near Earth Asteroid Rendezvous)
 Mars Global Surveyor
 MESSENGER
 Juno
 JCSAT-5A
 Sirius 4
 Nimiq 1
 SBIRS GEO 1 and GEO 2
 Intelsat 33e
 Beresheet lunar lander

There have been helium check valve problems on Juno leading to postponed maneuvers, and a failure after the first burn on Intelsat 33e requiring backup low-thrust jets to be used to bring the satellite to its intended orbit.

References 

Aylesbury Vale
Rocket engines of the United Kingdom
Science and technology in Buckinghamshire
Spacecraft propulsion
Rocket engines using hypergolic propellant
Rocket engines using the pressure-fed cycle